Slippy McGee may refer to:
 Slippy McGee (1923 film), an American silent drama film
 Slippy McGee (1948 film), an American crime film